Simon Irving (born ) is a former professional rugby league footballer who played in the 1990s and 2000s. He usually played at centre and was a regular goal kicker.

References

1967 births
Living people
Doncaster R.L.F.C. players
English rugby league players
Keighley Cougars players
Leeds Rhinos players
Place of birth missing (living people)
Rugby league centres